Alfred Michael Roedsted Schmidt (3 May 1858 – 4 April 1938)  was a Danish illustrator, caricaturist and painter. He later  became known primarily as a  cartoonist.

Biography
Alfred Schmidt was born at Horsens, Denmark.
He received lessons from painter and drawing master  Frederik Ferdinand Helsted (1809–1875) and later studied at the Royal Danish Academy of Fine Arts from 1874-1882. His art was featured at the Charlottenborg Spring Exhibition  1883-1886.

His ability to skew funny situations made him known and loved in broad circles.
He was best known for his satirical drawings of politicians, including a recurring joke about Prime Minister J.C. Christensen being accompanied by a fox as illustration of this politician's cunning. He was main editor and contributor to the satirical magazine Klods-Hans (1899-1926).
From 1880 he drew for Punch, Fliegende Blätte from 1884 and from 1889 for Blæksprutten.

He also illustrated books such as Christian Winther's picture book Flugten til Amerika (1900) and the later editions of Molbo story (molbohistorier)

He died at Hellerup in Gentofte and was buried at Garrison Cemetery, Copenhagen.

Gallery

References

1858 births
1938 deaths
19th-century Danish illustrators
20th-century Danish illustrators
19th-century Danish painters
Danish male painters
20th-century Danish painters
Royal Danish Academy of Fine Arts alumni
Danish caricaturists
Danish editorial cartoonists
Danish satirists
People from Horsens
Burials at the Garrison Cemetery, Copenhagen
19th-century Danish male artists
20th-century Danish male artists